Ruben Varosi Zaryan (Zarian, 1909, Alexandropol – 1994) was a Soviet Armenian theatre specialist, Doctor of Art history, Professor, awarded by the Renowned Master of the Armenian SSR title and medals.

Zaryan finished the Yerevan State University in 1936. He is the author of "The struggle for Russian dramaturgy at Armenian theatre", "Theatral portraits", "Siranuysh", "Shakespeare of Adamyan" and other books. Since 1958 he was director of Armenian SSR Institute of Arts.

References

1909 births
1969 deaths
Armenian scientists
Yerevan State University alumni
Soviet scientists